Cutting Ball Theater is a San Francisco-based theater company that experiments with theatrical form, beyond naturalism and conventionalism, to tell relevant stories that embolden and engage audiences. They are active citizens of our Tenderloin neighborhood and provide a theater educational program that introduces Tenderloin and Bay area youth to both experiencing and creating theater. New works performed by Cutting Ball include Bay Area premieres by American playwrights Will Eno and Eugenie Chan.

The company was founded in 1999 by theater artist Rob Melrose and Artistic Director Paige Rogers.

Cutting Ball was named "Best Theater Company" in San Francisco Bay Guardian's 2010 "Best of the Bay" issue.

In 2013, Cutting Ball was awarded the American Theatre Wing's National Theatre Company Grant.

References

External links 
 cuttingball.com
 Theatre Bay Area

Theatres in California
Performing groups established in 1999
1999 establishments in California